Fast & Furious: Original Motion Picture Score is the soundtrack to the film of the same name. The score was composed by Brian Tyler. The album, with a total of 25 tracks, was released on CD by Varèse Sarabande with 78 minutes and 11 seconds' worth of music.

Track listing

Composed and conducted by Brian Tyler. Performed by The Hollywood Studio Symphony. Brian Tyler performs by drums, percussion, keyboards, guitar and bass.

The chronological track order are: 1, 4, 18, 23, 19, 15, 8, 2, 7, 14, 16, 3, 10, 22, 17, 20, 21, 12, 13, 5, 24, 6, 25. The bonus tracks are: 9, 11.

References

Fast & Furious albums
2009 soundtrack albums
Varèse Sarabande soundtracks
Brian Tyler soundtracks
Action film soundtracks